Blue is the mark of a soda juice fruit and vitamins sold in Angola. The drink is available in 10 flavors. Released in 2005 by Refriango company, the market leader in Angola, it was awarded the Gold Medal at the International Monde Selection Quality. The Blue brand is available in distinct flavors which other Angolan carbonated soft drinks do not use.

The drink's slogan is "life is a feast".

Variants of the mark 
 Blue Pulp - with pieces of fruit, orange and pineapple are the fruit that remain in the mouth (Launched in 2012)
 Blue Lemon-Lime
 Blue Orange - with concentrated orange juice
 Blue Passion fruit - With passion fruit juice concentrate
 Blue Pineapple
 Blue Tamarind
 Blue Coco Pineapple
 Blue Tropical Strawberry
 Blue Apple
 Blue Guarana

Awards 
In 2013, Blue received a gold medal from the International Competition of Quality, Monde Selection. The highest award is only awarded to products which are distinguished by their quality, prestige and innovation worldwide.

References 

Soft drinks
African drinks
Food and drink introduced in 2005
2005 establishments in Angola